The following is a list of the MTV Europe Music Award winners and nominees for Best Latin America South Act. This category was always won by Argentina.

Winners and nominees

2010s

2020s

References

See also 
 MTV Video Music Award for Best Latin Artist
 MTV VMA International Viewer's Choice Award for MTV Latin America
 MTV VMA International Viewer's Choice Award for MTV Internacional
 Los Premios MTV Latinoamérica
 Los Premios MTV Latinoamérica for Best Artist — South

MTV Europe Music Awards
Argentine music awards
Uruguayan music
Awards established in 2012